Hamamözü is a town in Amasya Province in the Black Sea region of Turkey. It is the seat of Hamamözü District. Its population is 1,629 (2021). The population has shrunk 13% since 1990. It has an average altitude of 690 m. The mayor is Fatih Bayrakdar (MHP).

Facts
Hamamözü sits on the north-east foothills of the İnegöl mountains, 95 km west of the city of Amasya, 23 km from Gümüşhacıköy, and 45 km south of the city of Çorum. Being in high country inland from the Black Sea coast the climate is warm and dry in summer, moderately cold in winter but with more rain in spring and autumn than the countryside further inland. Much of the land is cultivated with grains and pulses; there are also large areas of forest and pasture. 

Hamamözü is not a wealthy district, people mainly living from agriculture and food from their own gardens, with the hot springs bringing some visitors to the town, which otherwise provides high schools and other basic amenities to the surrounding countryside. Younger generations are migrating to larger cities in search of careers.

Climate
Hamamözü has a warm-summer Mediterranean climate (Köppen: Csb).

Places of interest
The springs of Arkutbey, a popular place for walks and picnics as well as to drink and bathe in the healing mineral waters.

Famous residents
 Olympic gold medallist in 1956, wrestler Hamit Kaplan
 Wrestler Adil Candemir

References

Populated places in Amasya Province
Towns in Turkey
Hamamözü District